Basketball events were contested at the 1993 Summer Universiade in Buffalo, New York, USA.

References
 
 Results of The 17th Universiade '93 Buffalo: Basketball (universiade.fjct.fit.ac.jp)

Universaiie
1993 Summer Universiade
1993
Universiade